Sulaibikhat is a district of Kuwait City in Kuwait. It comprises five blocks.

Sulaibkhat Camp

The British camp was built in Sulaibikhat during the British mandate, and consisted of approximately 200 bungalow-style residential units, contained within a fenced area on the Persian Gulf.

After being deserted by the British at the end of the British mandate in 1961, the camp was occupied by senior government employees (doctors, engineers, pharmacists, veterinarians, lawyers, judges, etc.) working for the Government of Kuwait.

The Camp had its own police station. It had its own supermarket (the "Salwa Market"), and at one stage a laundry outlet and a hairstylist.

The Camp had a Club for the residents in the area with an outdoor swimming pool, three tennis clubs, a football field, and a cinema house. It was the gathering point of the youth on festive occasions. That continued to be the case until 1980, when the residents were relocated and the camp was demolished.

The Camp had its own chilled water cooling facility that pumped chilled water to all 200 houses. Fan units in the houses located in each room of the house maintained cool temperatures for the occupants.

The children who grew up in that camp formed a Facebook group in 2007. The group has over 170 members and actively maintains contact between the former residents.

References

Populated places in Kuwait